The 2019–20 Bangladesh Premier League is the 12th season of the Bangladesh Premier League since its establishment in 2007. A total of 13 football clubs will compete in the league.
Bashundhara Kings are the defending champions. Bangladesh Police FC and Uttar Baridhara SC entered as the promoted teams from the 2018–19 Bangladesh Championship League.

The season began on 13 February 2020 and was suspended on 15 March 2020, due to the COVID-19 pandemic in Bangladesh. On 17 May 2020, the league was declared void by the BFF executive committee.

Effects of the 2020 coronavirus pandemic
On 16 March 2020, All sorts of sports activities in Bangladesh were postponed until March 31 as a precaution to combat the spread of coronavirus in the country, according to a press release issued by the Ministry of Youth and Sports.

Bangladesh Football Federation (BFF) postponed all Bangladesh Premier League and Women's Football League matches until March 31.

On 17 May 2020, The BFF executive committee, following an emergency meeting, declared the 12th edition of the league abandoned, scrapping promotion and relegation while cancelling the Independence Cup from the calendar.

Teams

Stadiums and locations

Personnel and sponsoring

Foreign players

Bold names refer to international players who have already played or are still playing.
Note :: players who released during summer transfer window;: players who registered during summer transfer window.

League table

Results

Positions by round
The following table lists the positions of teams after each week of matches. In order to preserve the chronological evolution, any postponed matches are not included to the round at which they were originally scheduled but added to the full round they were played immediately afterward.

Statistics

Goalscorers

Hat-tricks 
† Bold Club indicates winner of the match

4  Player scored 4 goals.

References

Bangladesh
1
Bangladesh Football Premier League seasons
2019 in Bangladeshi football
Bangladesh Premier League, 2019-20